Eelco Heinen (born 27 April 1981) is a Dutch politician, serving as a member of the House of Representatives since March 2021. He is a member of the People's Party for Freedom and Democracy (VVD) and previously worked as a party staffer.

Early life and career 
He was born in 1981 in the North Holland town Laren and studied computer science at the Amsterdam University of Applied Sciences from 1998 until 2002. Heinen subsequently studied economics at the University of Amsterdam. After he graduated with a Master of Science degree in macroeconomics in 2005, he did another master's in international relations. He became a policy officer at the Ministry of Finance in 2007.

Between 2011 and 2014, Heinen worked as senior finance policy advisor for the VVD's House caucus and was promoted to political secretary and head of policy in the latter year. He had joined the VVD in 2006. He served as a member of the campaign team for the 2017 election and also helped write the election program.

Heinen – then also political assistant of MP Klaas Dijkhoff – ran for member of parliament in the 2021 general election, being placed twelfth on the VVD's party list. He was again member of the campaign team and of the election program committee. He was elected, receiving 679 preference votes, and he was sworn in as House member on 31 March. Heinen's specializations are government budget, European and international monetary policy, financial markets, financial supervision, state participation, government expenditure, macroeconomic policy, European economic policy, and National Growth Fund and he is on the Committees for Economic Affairs and Climate Policy, European Affairs, Finance, and Public Expenditure. When prices of petrol were on the rise, Heinen proposed to bring a planned increase in the tax-exempt traveling allowance forward in time. He also complained about spending by the cabinet without the House's approval. The cabinet has this power in case of a crisis, but Heinen decried their repeated use of the provision.

Personal life 
Heinen has a Spanish wife called Inés, and they have two sons. He is a resident of The Hague.

References 

1981 births
21st-century Dutch civil servants
21st-century Dutch politicians
Living people
Members of the House of Representatives (Netherlands)
People's Party for Freedom and Democracy politicians
Political staffers
University of Amsterdam alumni
Dutch political consultants